Each winner of the 1992 Governor General's Awards for Literary Merit received $10,000 and a medal from the Governor General of Canada.  The winners were selected by a panel of judges administered by the Canada Council for the Arts.

English

French Language

Governor General's Awards
Governor General's Awards
Governor General's Awards